Middle Park is an estate located in the Eltham district of the Royal Borough of Greenwich.

References

Districts of the Royal Borough of Greenwich
Areas of London
Eltham
Housing estates in the Royal Borough of Greenwich